Antonio de Villarroel y Pelaez (1656, Barcelona – 1726, A Coruña) was a Spanish military commander in the service of Philip V until 1710 in the War of the Spanish Succession. After the disgrace of the Duke of Orléans, he switched to the Habsburg cause of Charles VI, keeping his rank. In 1713 he was appointed general commander of the Army of Catalonia.

Military career

He joined the army at a very young age, and in 1697, he defended Barcelona against a French army. At the beginning of the War of Spanish Succession, he fought with the army of Philip V, but the fall from grace of the Duke of Orléans forced him to Galicia where he joined the Allied anti-Borbón league. He was there appointed a deputy marshal for the Archduke Charles VI.

Once in the service of the Habsburgs, he distinguished himself in the Battle of Villaviciosa and in the thankless task of evacuation of Aragon in 1711. In recognition of his accomplishments, he was appointed supreme commander of the forces of Catalonia and was charged with organizing city defenses in the 1713-14 Siege of Barcelona. With just over 5,000 men, of whom about 3,500 were members of the guild militia, Villarroel was forced to defend the city against the 40,000 French and Spanish army of Phillip V. As the summer of 1714 passed, desperate times in Barcelona forced Villarroel to attempt to force an exit of the city.  The attempted exit was repulsed by the Duke of Berwick who had replaced the Duke of Popoli as commander of the besiegers.  By September, the Franco-Spanish forces had opened a sizable breach in the walls and the city counselors pleaded with Villarroel to capitulate the city to the Duke of Berwick.  Refusing to surrender the city, Villarroel continued defending the city until he was injured, whereupon the city was officially surrendered to the forces of Phillip V.  Despite assurances given contrary to the fact, the 25 military commanders of Barcelona's defenses, including Villarroel, were all imprisoned.

Imprisonment and death

Villarroel was imprisoned first in the castle of Alicante and later (1715) in A Coruña, where he died (22 February 1726). He spent his last years confined in a cell that flooded with the rising tide, circumstance that caused a total paralysis of his two legs. The actual date of his death was discovered by Josep Catà and Antoni Muñoz in 2009. Until then, it was considered that Villarroel had been released from the Alcazar of Segovia following the peace of Vienna and had lived in the pension that would have granted, until his death, the Archduke Charles Emperor of the Holy Roman Empire.

Legacy
A street in the l'Eixample district of modern Barcelona is named after Villarroel.

In the historical novel Victus of the Catalan writer Albert Sánchez Piñol, about the war of the Spanish succession and specially the Siege of Barcelona, Villarroel is portrayed as the true hero of the Barcelona defense.

References 
 Some of the information on this page has been translated from its Spanish Equivalent.

1656 births
1726 deaths
Spanish prisoners of war
History of Barcelona
Military history of Catalonia